On February 12, 2010, three people were killed and three others wounded in a shooting at the University of Alabama in Huntsville (UAH) in Huntsville, Alabama, United States. During a routine meeting of the biology department attended by approximately 12 people, Amy Bishop, a biology professor at the university, began shooting those nearest her with a Ruger P95 handgun.

Bishop was charged with one count of capital murder and three counts of attempted murder. On September 11, 2012, she pleaded guilty to the charges after family members of victims petitioned the judge against use of the death penalty. The jury heard a condensed version of the evidence on September 24, as required by Alabama law. The same day, Bishop was sentenced to life in prison without the possibility of parole.

In March 2009, Bishop had been denied tenure at UAH, making spring 2010 her last semester there, per university policy. Due to the attention Bishop attracted as a result of the shooting, previous violent incidents in which she had been involved or implicated were reevaluated. In 1986, she shot and killed her brother in Braintree, Massachusetts, in an incident officially ruled an accident. She was also questioned, along with her husband, after a 1993 pipe bomb incident directed at her lab supervisor.

Shooting

The day of the shooting, Bishop taught her anatomy and neurosciences class at the University of Alabama in Huntsville (UAH). A student later said Bishop "seemed perfectly normal" during the lecture. Bishop then attended a biology department faculty meeting on the third floor of the Shelby Center for Science and Technology. According to witnesses, 12 or 13 people attended the meeting, which was described as "an ordinary faculty meeting." Bishop's behavior was also described as "normal" just before the shooting. 

Bishop sat quietly at the meeting for 30 to 40 minutes before pulling out a Ruger P95 9mm handgun just before 4:00 p.m. A witness said that she "got up suddenly, took out a gun and started shooting at each one of us. She started with the one closest to her, and went down the row shooting her targets in the head." Another survivor said, "This wasn't random shooting around the room; this was execution style." Those who were shot were on one side of the oval table; the five on the other side dropped to the floor.

After Bishop had fired several rounds, Debra Moriarity, a biochemistry professor, said that she pointed the gun at her and pulled the trigger, but heard only a "click," as her gun "either jammed or ran out of ammunition." She described Bishop as initially appearing "angry," then "perplexed." Joseph Ng, an associate professor, said Moriarity attempted to stop Bishop by approaching her and asking her to stop, and helped the other survivors push Bishop from the room and block the door. Ng said, "Moriarity was probably the one that saved our lives. She was the one that initiated the rush."

Investigation
The suspected murder weapon was found in a bathroom on the second floor of the science building. Bishop did not have a permit to carry a concealed weapon. She was arrested a few minutes later outside the building. Shortly after her arrest, Bishop was quoted as saying, "It didn't happen. There's no way." When asked about the deaths of her colleagues, Bishop replied, "There's no way. They're still alive."

Police interviewed Bishop's husband, James Anderson, after it was determined that she had called him to pick her up after the shooting; they did not charge him. The couple were seen leaving their home with duffel bags on Friday afternoon before the shooting. Anderson said that Bishop had borrowed the gun used in the shooting and that he had escorted her to an indoor shooting range in the weeks before the incident.

Shortly after Bishop's arrest, there was concern that she had "booby trapped the science building with a 'herpes bomb'" intended to spread the virus. She had worked with the herpes virus during her postdoctoral studies, and had written a novel describing the spread of a virus similar to herpes throughout the world. The police had already searched the premises, finding only the murder weapon.

Victims
Three faculty members were killed and three others injured. Only a few students were in the building at the time of the shooting, and none were harmed. A memorial service was held at UAH on February 19, 2010, with 3,000 people in attendance.

Perpetrator
Amy Bishop (born April 24, 1965; age 44 at the time of the shooting) is married to Jimmy "James" Anderson and is the mother of four children. She grew up in Massachusetts, attended Braintree High School, and completed her undergraduate degree at Northeastern University in Boston, where her father, Samuel Bishop, was a professor in the art department. She earned her Ph.D. in genetics from Harvard University.

Bishop's 1993 dissertation at Harvard was titled "The role of methoxatin (PQQ) in the respiratory burst of phagocytes." Her research interests include induction of adaptive resistance to nitric oxide in the central nervous system and utilization of motor neurons for the development of neural circuits grown on biological computer chips. An anonymous source at Harvard said that Bishop's work was of poor quality and undeserving of a doctoral degree, calling it "local scandal No. 1."

University of Alabama in Huntsville
Bishop joined the faculty of UAH's Department of Biological Sciences as an assistant professor in 2003; she was teaching five courses before the shooting. Previously, she was an instructor at Harvard Medical School. She and her husband's "portable cell incubator" came in third in a technology competition, winning $25,000. Prodigy Biosystems, where Anderson is employed, raised $1.25 million to develop the automated cell incubator. UAH president David Williams considered that the incubator would "change the way biological and medical research is conducted," but some scientists consulted by the press declared it unnecessary and too expensive.

Bishop, a second cousin of the novelist John Irving, had written three unpublished novels. One featured a woman scientist working to defeat a pandemic virus, and struggling with suicidal thoughts at the prospect of not earning tenure. The novels reportedly "reveal a deep preoccupation with the concept of deliverance from sin." Bishop was a member of the Hamilton Writer's Group while living in Ipswich, Massachusetts, in the late 1990s and was said to believe that writing would be "her ticket out of academia." Members of the club said she "would frequently cite her Harvard degree and family ties to Irving to boost her credential as a serious writer." Another member described her as smart but abrasive in her interactions and as feeling "entitled to praise." Bishop had a literary agent but had not published any books.

Several colleagues had expressed concern over Bishop's behavior. She was described as interrupting meetings with "bizarre tangents... left-field kind of stuff," "strange," and "crazy." One of these colleagues was a member of Bishop's tenure review committee. After her tenure was denied and she learned that this colleague had called her "crazy," Bishop filed a complaint with the Equal Employment Opportunity Commission (EEOC), alleging sex discrimination, citing the professor's remark as possible evidence. The professor did not retract his comments:
The professor was given the opportunity to back off the claim, or to say it was a flippant remark. But he didn't. "I said she was crazy multiple times and I stand by that," the professor said. "This woman has a pattern of erratic behavior. She did things that weren't normal ... she was out of touch with reality."

Bishop was reportedly a poor instructor and unpopular among her students. She dismissed several graduate students from her lab, and others sought transfers out. In 2009, several UAH students said they complained to administrators about Bishop on at least three occasions, saying she was "ineffective in the classroom and had odd, unsettling ways." A petition signed by "dozens of students" was sent to the department head. The complaints did not result in any classroom changes. Also in 2009, Bishop published an article in a vanity-press medical journal listing her husband and three minor children as co-authors. The article was later removed from the journal website.

Tenure denial and appeal
As explained by Williams, the university president, after Bishop was denied tenure in March 2009, she could not expect to have her teaching contract renewed after March 2010. She appealed the decision to UAH's administration. Without reviewing the content of the tenure application, it determined that the process was carried out according to policy and denied the appeal. The routine faculty meeting at which Bishop opened fire was unrelated to her tenure.

Bishop's husband said the denial of tenure had been "an issue" in recent months and described the tenure process as "a long, basically hard fight." He said that it was his understanding that Bishop "exceeded the qualifications for tenure" and that she was distressed at the likelihood of losing her position barring a successful appeal. She approached members of the University of Alabama System's board of trustees, and hired a lawyer who was "finding one problem after another with the process." One point of dispute was whether two of her papers had been published in time to count toward tenure. Bishop, who gave more weight to obtaining patents than publishing papers, reportedly received several warnings that she needed to publish more to receive tenure.

Previous incidents

Brother's shooting
In 1986, at age 21, Bishop fatally shot her 18-year-old brother Seth at their home in Braintree, Massachusetts. She fired two shots from a 12-gauge pump-action shotgun (one into her bedroom wall and one into Seth's chest). Later, she pointed the gun at a moving vehicle on the adjacent road and tried to get into the vehicle.

Bishop and her mother told police the shooting had been an accident. Police found a live round in the gun's chamber, meaning that Bishop must have racked its slide after shooting her brother. After a brief inquiry into the incident by the Massachusetts State Police in 1986 (reported in 1987), they repeated the Braintree police department's initial assessment that the shooting was accidental. Norfolk County District Attorney Bill Delahunt, later elected to the U.S. House of Representatives, did not file charges. Detailed records of the shooting had disappeared by 1988. Braintree police chief Paul Frazier said on February 13, 2010, "The report's gone, removed from the files."

After speaking with officers involved with the case in 1986, Frazier called the "accident" description inaccurate. He and others said that then-chief John Polio had ordered Bishop released to her mother Judy, who was allegedly a political supporter of the chief as a member of the Braintree town council. They said that Bishop had demanded to meet with Polio personally after the arrest instead of being charged for the shooting. Frazier was not on duty during the incident but recalled "how frustrated the members of the department were over the release" of Bishop.

Other officers, Frazier said, believed that Polio had "fix[ed] a murder," resulting in what he described as "a miscarriage of justice. Just because it was a friend of his." The now-retired Polio denied that there had been a cover-up. Frazier's 2010 account and the 1987 Massachusetts State Police report differ in several key details, including whether Bishop had been arguing with her brother or with her father before the shooting.

2010 investigation
On February 16, 2010, Braintree officials announced that the files previously missing had been found, and Norfolk County District Attorney William Keating concluded that probable cause existed in 1986 to arrest and charge Bishop for crimes committed after she fled the house. She had taken the shotgun to a nearby auto dealership shop and brandished it at two employees in an attempt to get a car. She could have been charged with assault with a dangerous weapon, carrying a dangerous weapon, and unlawful possession of ammunition. The statute of limitations had expired on these charges. 

The most serious charge considered in 1986 was manslaughter for the death of her brother. Massachusetts Governor Deval Patrick ordered the state police to review their investigation, saying, "It is critical that we provide as clear an understanding as possible about all aspects of this case and its investigation to ensure that where mistakes were made they are not repeated in the future." An investigation was opened in which the state cooperated with the Norfolk County District Attorney's office to assess the state, local police, and then-DA's handling of the case.

On February 25, 2010, Keating sent District Court Judge Mark Coven a letter to start a judicial inquest into the 1986 shooting. Keating said that recently enlarged crime scene photos from Bishop's bedroom reveal a news article in which a similar crime was reported. He speculated that this article may relate to Bishop's intent. Keating did not identify the specific news article, but The Boston Globe wrote that an Internet search revealed that "two weeks earlier, the parents of Patrick Duffy, the actor who played Bobby Ewing on the popular television show Dallas, were killed in Montana by an assailant wielding a 12-gauge shotgun, who then held up a car dealership, stole a pickup truck, and fled."

On March 1, 2010, Detective Brian Howe, the state police's lead investigator in the 1986 shooting, said he looked forward to addressing the judicial inquest and stood by his 1987 report. He had agreed with Captain Theodore Buker, the late Braintree lead investigator, that the shooting was accidental. Howe said he was assigned to the case nearly two hours after the shooting and immediately called Braintree police. Buker told him that he would not be needed that day and that Bishop had already been released into her parents' custody. Howe said that Braintree police never informed him that she had later allegedly accosted employees at a car dealership at gunpoint, demanding a car. He said that he repeatedly requested the December 6 incident reports from the Braintree police, but never received them.

On March 1, 2010, Keating announced that an inquest would be held on April 13–16, 2010. Judge Coven, first justice of Quincy District Court, was scheduled to hold the inquest. During the inquest, Braintree police officers testified that Judy Bishop had asked for Polio by name before the officers were ordered to release Amy Bishop. Judy, Polio, and his wife all testified that Judy and Polio had not been friends, and Judy denied that she had asked for Polio at the station.

On June 16, 2010, Amy Bishop was charged with first degree murder in her brother's death, nearly 24 years after his shooting. Keating commented, "I can't give you any explanations, I can't give you excuses, because there are none. Jobs weren't done, responsibilities weren't met and justice wasn't served." Bishop's parents, who claim that the Braintree officers lied about the events at the station, issued a statement after the indictment. They wrote, "We cannot explain or even understand what happened in Alabama. However, we know that what happened 23 years ago to our son, Seth, was an accident."

The protagonist of the first of Bishop's unpublished novels is a woman who, as a child, attempted to frighten a friend after an argument but accidentally killed the friend's brother. Patrick Radden Keefe has speculated, after reviewing the evidence, that Bishop had meant to frighten or shoot her father with the shotgun after an argument and mistook her brother for him.

Pipe-bomb incident
In 1993, Bishop and her husband were suspected of sending two letter-bombs, which failed to explode, to Paul Rosenberg, a Harvard Medical School professor. Rosenberg was Bishop's supervisor at a Children's Hospital neurobiology lab and had given a negative evaluation of Bishop, who resigned from her position. Bishop was afterward said to be "on the verge of a nervous breakdown," and her husband reportedly said that he wanted to "shoot," "stab," or "strangle" Rosenberg.

The investigation was closed with no charges filed. After the Huntsville shootings the case was reviewed, but it remains unsolved.

International House of Pancakes assault
In 2002, Bishop assaulted a woman who had taken the last booster seat at an International House of Pancakes. When the woman refused to give up the seat, Bishop punched her in the head while yelling, "I am Dr. Amy Bishop!" Bishop pleaded guilty and received probation; prosecutors recommended that she attend anger management classes. Her husband said she had never attended anger management classes.

Charges
After the Huntsville shooting, Bishop was charged with one count of capital murder and three counts of attempted murder. The police confiscated her computer, her family's minivan, and a large binder containing documents pertaining to her "tenure battle." She secured an unnamed attorney and was held at Madison County jail without bail. Her court-appointed attorney was Roy W. Miller. Prosecutors said from the outset that they would seek the death penalty. According to state law, Bishop was eligible for either the death penalty or life in prison.

On February 15, during a closed-door hearing presided over by an Alabama judge, the charges were read to Bishop. After the hearing, Bishop was on suicide watch, a standard procedure in such cases. Her husband said she called him before her arraignment and they spoke for approximately two minutes. He said, "She seems to be doing OK." On March 12, while executing a search warrant on Bishop's residence, the police discovered a "suspicious device" prompting an evacuation of the nearby neighborhood; it was later identified by the bomb squad as non-explosive.

Miller visited Bishop in jail and said she did not remember the shooting and was "very cogent" but seemed to recognize that "she has a loose grip on reality." Initially, he said Bishop had severe mental health issues that appear to be paranoid schizophrenia, but later retracted that statement, saying "he had spoken out of turn." In February 2013, Bishop told Keefe that she was being treated for paranoid schizophrenia with haloperidol. Miller told a reporter for The New York Times, "This is not a whodunit. This lady has committed this offense or offenses in front of the world. It gets to be a question in my mind of her mental capacity at the time, or her mental state at the time that these acts were committed." Miller said he would enlist the help of one or more psychiatrists to examine his client, who said this was not the first time she had no recollection of something that had happened. He said he did not know if Bishop was insane; determining whether she was culpable for her actions would be left to a psychiatrist. He did say that she was "very sorry for what she's done."

On June 18, two days after Bishop was indicted for the murder of her brother in a reopened case, she attempted suicide in Huntsville jail. She survived and was treated at a hospital and then returned to jail; her husband complained that authorities did not inform him of the incident.

In November 2010, survivors Leahy and Monticciolo filed lawsuits against Bishop and Anderson to recover damages. In January 2011, attorneys representing Davis's and Johnson's families filed wrongful death lawsuits against Bishop, Anderson, and UAH. In September 2011, Bishop pleaded not guilty by means of the insanity defense.

In 2012, the spouse of one of the murdered researchers wrote a letter to the judge presiding over the case. In this letter, the writer indicated the researcher's family had greatly suffered from its loss but did not see any benefit from the loss of another life. In response to this letter, Bishop's lawyers offered to change her plea to guilty in exchange for the prosecution not seeking the death penalty. Upon receiving this offer, chief prosecutor Robert Broussard contacted and learned from the nine survivors that none of them wanted a death sentence for Bishop. On the basis of these opinions, Broussard decided not to seek the death penalty. Bishop then changed her plea to guilty.

Sentencing and appeal
On September 24, 2012, Bishop was sentenced to life in prison without the possibility of parole. Norfolk County declined to seek her extradition. Through her Massachusetts lawyer, Bishop said she wanted to be tried for her brother's death in order to vindicate herself. She is serving her sentence at the Julia Tutwiler Prison for Women in Wetumpka, Alabama.  her security classification is medium and her residence is a dormitory instead of a cell block.

After pleading guilty in September 2012 and waiving her right to appeal, Bishop filed an appeal on February 11, 2013. The appeal stated that she was not informed of the rights she would be waiving by pleading guilty, that she was not correctly informed of the minimum range of punishment, and that the circuit court failed to explain that she could withdraw her plea. On April 26, 2013, the Court of Criminal Appeals of Alabama rejected the appeal, holding that Bishop failed to challenge the validity of her guilty pleas in the circuit court and did not file either a motion to withdraw her pleas or a motion for a new trial.

Homicide of son
On April 18, 2021, Bishop's 20-year-old son Seth Anderson (who was named for the brother she murdered) was shot dead in Huntsville. The shooter was charged with manslaughter.

Media

Television
 Vengeance Killer Coworkers S01E04 "Deadly Ambition"
 Snapped S10E04 "Amy Bishop"
 Fatal Encounters S03E04 "Deadly Genius"
 Deadly Women S11E12 "Tipping Point"

References

External links

 UAH Shooting coverage The Huntsville Times
 Times Topics: Amy Bishop The New York Times
 Details of the Amy Bishop case The Boston Globe
 Amy Bishop faculty web page UAH (on the Internet Archive)

2010 active shooter incidents in the United States
2010 in Alabama
2010 mass shootings in the United States
2010 murders in the United States
2012 in Alabama
Attacks in the United States in 2010
Crimes in Alabama
Deaths by firearm in Alabama
February 2010 crimes in the United States
History of Huntsville, Alabama
Mass shootings in Alabama
Mass shootings in the United States
Murder in Alabama
School killings in the United States
University and college shootings in the United States
University of Alabama in Huntsville
Workplace shootings